8 Wack Wack Road is a 42-story residential skyscraper in Mandaluyong, Metro Manila, Philippines. It is located in Brgy. Wack Wack.

References

See also
List of tallest buildings in Metro Manila

Residential skyscrapers in Metro Manila
Residential buildings completed in 2000
20th-century architecture in the Philippines